Azara is a genus of ten species of flowering plants in the family Salicaceae, native to temperate to subtropical regions of South America. They are most often found at woodland margins and lakesides.
Azara was formerly classed in the family Flacourtiaceae.

They are evergreen shrubs and small trees growing to 1–8 m tall. The leaves are alternate, or in some species they appear paired, are simple 1–9 cm long and 0.5–5 cm broad. The opposite-leaved appearance of some species is unusual in that one stipule is enlarged giving the appearance of opposite ["paired"] leaves. The flowers are small, yellow or greenish, strongly fragrant, with a 4-5-lobed calyx and no petals but conspicuous long, often brightly colored, stamens; flowering is in spring. The fruit is a red to black berry 3–10 mm diameter.

Several species are cultivated as ornamental plants in gardens. In temperate regions they require the shelter of a wall.

List of species
Azara alpina
Azara celastrina
Azara dentata
Azara integrifolia goldspire azara
Azara lanceolata lanceleaf azara
Azara microphylla boxleaf azara, with fan-like branches and small dark, glossy leaves
Azara petiolaris holly azara, with smooth oval leaves
Azara salicifolia
Azara serrata
Azara uruguayensis

References

External links
Tree Selection Guide: Azara
Pictures and information of A. dentata, A. microphylla and A. petiolaris

Salicaceae
Salicaceae genera